The 1957 Pau Grand Prix was a non-championship Formula One race held at Pau on 22 April 1957. The 110-lap race was won by Maserati driver Jean Behra after starting from pole position. His teammate Harry Schell finished second and Connaught driver Ivor Bueb came in third.

Classification 

Pau Grand Prix
Pau Grand Prix
1957 in French motorsport